The 17th Academy Awards were held on March 15, 1945 at Grauman's Chinese Theatre, honoring the films of 1944. This was the first time the complete awards ceremony was broadcast nationally, on the Blue Network (ABC Radio). Bob Hope hosted the 70-minute broadcast, which included film clips that required explanation for the radio audience.

This year was notable for being the only time an individual was nominated for two acting awards for the same role in the same film: Barry Fitzgerald received nominations for both Best Actor and Best Supporting Actor for his performance as Father Fitzgibbon in the Best Picture winner Going My Way. Fitzgerald won for Best Supporting Actor, while his co-star Bing Crosby won Best Actor.

Awards

Nominees were announced on February 3, 1945. Winners are listed first and highlighted in boldface.

Academy Honorary Award
Bob Hope "for his many services to the Academy".

Academy Juvenile Award
Margaret O'Brien

Irving G. Thalberg Memorial Award
Darryl F. Zanuck

Presenters
Hugo Butler (Presenter: Writing Awards)
Charles Coburn (Presenter: Best Supporting Actor)
John Cromwell (Presenter: Documentary Awards, Short Subject Awards, the Scientific & Technical Awards, Best Film Editing, Best Sound Recording, Best Art Direction, and Best Special Effects)
Barry Fitzgerald (Presenter: Best Actor)
Bob Hope (Presenter: Best Cinematography and Best Original Song)
Jennifer Jones (Presenter: Best Actress)
Mervyn LeRoy (Presenter: Best Director)
Norma Shearer (Presenter: Irving G. Thalberg Memorial Award)
Hal B. Wallis (Presenter: Best Picture)
Walter Wanger (Presenter: Honorary Award to Bob Hope)
Teresa Wright (Presenter: Best Supporting Actress)

Multiple nominations and awards

The following 29 films received multiple nominations:
 10 nominations: Going My Way and Wilson
 9 nominations: Since You Went Away
 7 nominations: Double Indemnity and Gaslight
 5 nominations: Cover Girl and Laura
 4 nominations: Kismet, Meet Me in St. Louis and None but the Lonely Heart
 3 nominations: The Adventures of Mark Twain, Brazil, Casanova Brown, Hollywood Canteen, Lady in the Dark and Lifeboat
 2 nominations: Address Unknown; Dragon Seed; Higher and Higher; It Happened Tomorrow; Lady, Let's Dance; Minstrel Man; Mr. Skeffington; Mrs. Parkington; The Princess and the Pirate; Song of the Open Road; Thirty Seconds Over Tokyo; Up in Arms and Voice in the Wind

The following three films received multiple awards:
 7 wins: Going My Way
 5 wins: Wilson
 2 wins: Gaslight

See also
2nd Golden Globe Awards
1944 in film

References

Academy Awards ceremonies
1944 film awards
1945 in American cinema
1945 in Los Angeles
ABC radio programs
March 1945 events in the United States